Michael Graham Cuming (born 18 December 1990 in Macclesfield) is an English racing cyclist, who last rode for UCI Continental team .

Major results
2012
 1st  Road race, National Under-23 Road Championships
 3rd Tobago Cycling Classic
2013
 1st  Overall Tour de Korea
2014
 1st Prologue (TTT) Mzansi Tour
 1st Stage 5 Tour de Korea
2016
 1st Stage 5 New Zealand Cycle Classic
 7th Overall Tour de Kumano

References

External links

1990 births
Living people
English male cyclists
Sportspeople from Macclesfield